The 2019 Football Championship of Zhytomyr Oblast was won by Zviahel Novohrad-Volynskyi.

League table

References

Football
Zhytomyr
Zhytomyr